Krishna Hariharan (born 24 September 1955) is an Indian Test cricket umpire.

Harihan became a T20 cricket umpire in 2001.  He stood as an umpire in 34 One-day Internationals between 1997 and 2006, but only 2 Test matches.  He made his debut as a Test umpire in the 1st Test between England and Bangladesh at Lord's in May 2005, in which England lost only 3 wickets to win by an innings and 261 runs within three days, and then stood in the 2nd Test between Bangladesh and Sri Lanka at Boghra in March 2006, which Sri Lanka won by 10 wickets early on the fourth day.  He also umpired matches in the Indian Premier League in 2008, 2009 and 2010 seasons.

See also
 List of Test cricket umpires
 List of One Day International cricket umpires

References

External links
Profile from Cricinfo

Living people
1955 births
Indian Test cricket umpires
Indian One Day International cricket umpires